Aethopyga is a genus of birds in the sunbird family Nectariniidae. Species in this genus are found in South Asia, Southeast Asia and parts of China. Many species such as the grey-hooded sunbird, Apo sunbird, Apo sunbird, Tboli sunbird, metallic-winged sunbird, handsome sunbird and Lina's sunbird are endemic to the Philippines.

Taxonomy
The genus Aethopyga was introduced in 1851 by the German ornithologist Jean Cabanis. The name combines the Ancient Greek aithos  meaning "fire" or "burning heat" with pugē meaning "rump". The type species was designated as the crimson sunbird by George Robert Gray in 1855.

Species
The genus contains 22 species:

References

 
Bird genera
Taxonomy articles created by Polbot